The 2006 South Carolina State Elections took place on November 7, 2006, and included the gubernatorial election. All nine popularly elected constitutional officers were up for reelection, and all races except the Attorney General's were contested.  The entire South Carolina House of Representatives, one state senator and six state circuit solicitors were also up for election.  Several constitutional amendments were also on the ballot.

Filing for the major parties closed on March 28, 2006, and filing for minor parties closed on August 15. The primaries for both parties were held on June 13, and run-offs were held June 27.  All results are taken from the South Carolina Election Commission's official results. Percentages may not add up to 100 because of rounding.

Constitutional Officers

Governor
Republican primary
Mark Sanford - incumbent Governor, former realtor and U.S. Representative
Oscar Lovelace - physician

Lovelace's candidacy was largely quixotic, although it did garner some interest from disaffected Republicans and Democrats.  The Prosperity doctor emphasized working across party lines, health care reform, opposition to school vouchers and job creation.  Sanford largely ignored Lovelace's campaign, even refusing to attend a South Carolina Educational Television (SCETV) debate with his opponent.  Although Lovelace made a stronger than expected showing in the primary, his loss was not surprising.

Democratic primary
Tommy Moore - State Senator from Aiken County and businessman
Frank Willis - mayor of Florence
C. Dennis Aughtry - attorney
Kenneth Lamar Holland (withdrew) - former U.S. Representative

Moore obtained the support of much of the state party months in advance, having declared his candidacy early.  Moore ran on a platform that stressed his experience in state government and support for consensus-building politics.  Willis largely self-financed his campaign, highlighting his history fighting crime in Florence and bringing economic development to the PeeDee.  Aughtry was a late entrant in the race, and based almost his entire campaign off the idea of legalizing casino gambling in the state to boost revenues.  Holland briefly entered the race, but left when it became apparent he could not raise enough money to be an effective candidate.  His name was not on the primary ballot.  Moore won with an absolute majority, avoiding a run-off.

General Election

Before the general election campaign, major issues in the race were expected to likely be South Carolina's property tax, cigarette tax, and school vouchers.  However, the race had surprisingly low visibility, with the only major issue being the governor's combative relationship with the legislature.  Job creation and public school investment were minor issues in the campaign.  Despite being named one of the worst Governors in the country by Time Magazine  a year before the election and generally being seen as ineffective, Sanford defeated Moore in the general election by ten points.

State Senator Jake Knotts considered mounting an independent candidacy for governor, and collected enough petition signatures to theoretically qualify for the ballot, but decided not to run.

Lieutenant Governor
Republican primary
André Bauer (Incumbent) - former state Representative from Lexington County and businessman
Mike Campbell - son of former Governor Carroll Campbell, businessman
Henry Jordan - frequent candidate

The Republican primary was expected to be messy and close between Bauer and Campbell, but the former's plane crash and resulting public sympathy late in the race stymied negative campaigning.  Campbell relied upon a base of support in the Upstate, where support for his father was strong, while Bauer made stops all across the state in a traditional face-to-face campaign.  Campbell received an endorsements from former president George H. W. Bush, support that was the basis of one of his television ads. Jordan, a late entrant, went negative against both camps in radio and internet ads, but never gained traction outside of Anderson. No candidate received 50% of the votes in the primary, and thus Campbell and Bauer faced each other in a run-off, which Bauer won.

General Election

The Lieutenant Governor's race was dominated by the missteps of Bauer, the incumbent.  Bauer came under criticism for multiple citations for speeding and flamboyant personality.  His controversial public image, and the fundraising prowess of his opponent, Robert Barber, who did not face a primary, kept the race close in public polling throughout the campaign.  In late May, a two-passenger plane which Bauer was piloting crashed in the Upstate.  Bauer's ankle was shattered, but otherwise he and the passenger in the plane survived with minimal injuries.  The plane crash was later determined to have been caused by faulty bolts in the plane's construction.  Barber later suffered from his own personal problems with his James Beard Award winning restaurant, Bowen's Island, burned late in the campaign.  Bauer eventually won the general election with less than one percent over the vote after a recount.

Secretary of State
Republican Primary
Mark Hammond (Incumbent)
Bill McKown - Surfside Beach Town Councilman
L. W. Flynn (withdrew) - 2004 candidate for the State House of Representatives

Hammond initially faced little opposition from Flynn and McKown and far out fundraised both.  However, Flynn withdrew from the race and endorsed McKown, whose campaign picked up traction based on questioning Hammond's conservatism and support for the governor.  Hammond eventually defeated McKown.  Although Flynn received 6.5% of the vote in the primary, his votes were not officially tallied.

General Election

Mark Hammond faced Democratic challenger Cheryl Footman, who did not face a primary.  In a rather bizarre moment in the race, Footman attempted to burst into patriotic song at the end of her SCETV debate with Hammond, but was quickly cut off by the moderator.  Hammond easily won re-election.

State Treasurer
Republican Primary
Thomas Ravenel - 2004 Senate Republican primary candidate and businessman
Greg Ryberg - 2002 Treasurer candidate, state Senator from Aiken
Rick Quinn - former SC House Majority Leader
Jeff Willis - real estate developer

The Republican treasurer's race was hotly contested.  Ryberg and Quinn were initially seen to be the front-runners, and Ryberg, the 2002 Republican nominee, made an early $2 million loan to his campaign.  Ultimately, Ravenel defeated his opponents in the primary just short of the necessary 50 percent total to prevent a run-off.  Ryberg and Quinn both withdrew from the run-off, citing the need for party unity behind Ravenel.  Ravenel easily defeated Willis in the run-off.

General Election

The treasurer's race pitted Thomas Ravenel, a young millionaire and emerging politician, against Grady Patterson, a nine-term incumbent who did not face primary opposition.  The race was largely fought over the state of South Carolina's employee pension fund, with Ravenel taking issue with the state's projected unfunded liability and its failure to invest the fund in equity funds, which he claims would boost returns.  Patterson retorted by pointing out Ravenel's inexperience and accusing Ravenel of using the race as a platform to run against incumbent Senator Lindsey Graham, which Ravenel denied was his intention.  Thomas Ravenel won the election, but was indicted on June 19, 2007 on cocaine charges, and has been suspended as Treasurer.

Attorney General

The incumbent, Henry McMaster, did not face a primary and ran unopposed in the general election.

Comptroller General

Neither party held a primary for the race.  The incumbent, Richard Eckstrom, was challenged by Drew Theodore, businessman and son of former Lieutenant Governor Nick Theodore.  The only public issue in the race was incumbent Richard Eckstrom's use of a state-owned car to drive himself to Minnesota a year earlier, and also his use of state funds to refurbish his state offices upon taking office in 2003.  The race got some national attention when Saturday Night Live aired a sketch September 30, lampooning President Bush's low popularity by portraying Eckstrom as the only Republican running for office who was willing to be seen campaigning with the president.  Eckstrom eventually won reelection.

Superintendent of Education

Republican Primary
Karen Floyd - former Spartanburg County County Council Chair, attorney
Bob Staton - businessman, former chair of the SC Education Oversight Committee
Mike Ryan - teacher
Elizabeth Moffly - businesswoman
Kerry Wood (withdrew) - computer programmer

The crowded Republican primary was dominated by Floyd's campaign from the start.  Floyd was able to gain the endorsements of the governor, both Senators, Republican Congressmen and state legislators early in the race, when it was presumed that she would be running against incumbent Inez Tenenbaum.  When Tenenbaum announced she would not be running, more serious candidates began eyeing the race, and Bob Staton eventually became the viable alternative to Floyd.  His race emphasized an opposition to school vouchers and support for existing aspects of public education.  The other, more minor candidates, were largely united in an anti-voucher position.  Ryan distinguished himself by straying from attacks on the state's standardized test regime, the PACT, instead supporting the idea of standardized testing as a way to create standards in education.  Just before the election, Wood withdrew from the race and endorsed Staton, but despite this his votes were officially tallied after the race.  Floyd won the primary, barely surpassing the 50 percent threshold to avoid a run-off.

Democrats
Jim Rex - former Columbia College president, former teacher
Cecil Taliaferro (withdrew) - former COO of Allen University
Ed Murray (withdrew) - teacher

Although Tenenbaum began preparing for a campaign in 2005, she eventually decided against running and withdrew from the race.  Cecil Taliaferro and Ed Murray, two Democrats, then entered the race.  Frank Holleman, Tenenbaum's campaign manager in her 2004 Senate run and former Deputy Secretary of Education, considered a run but did not enter the race.  When Rex announced his candidacy, he received wide acclaim from the party, and Taliaferro and Murray withdrew before filing.  Since, Tenenbaum, Holleman, Murray and Elizabeth Moffly have endorsed Rex's candidacy.

Third parties
Arnold E. Karr (Green Party) - correctional educator and union activist
Tim Moultrie (Libertarian Party) - teacher, 1998 Libertarian gubernatorial candidate
Ralph Linblad (Constitution Party) - machinist, briefly 2006 Constitution gubernatorial candidate
Tony Fayyazi (independent) - educator

Tim Moultrie won the nomination of the Libertarian Party at their Lowcountry convention, fending off Rebekah Sutherland, the Libertarian Party's 2004 candidate for US Senate.  Karr has received the endorsement of the South Carolina AFL-CIO and affiliated unions. His campaign is stressing the independence of the Superintendent's Office from that of the Governor, empowerment of public educators, and funding equity for all school districts in the state. He has proposed using SC lottery proceeds to subsidize poorer districts until the General Assembly enacts a permanent funding plan.  Lindblad has pledged to dissolve the SC Department of Education if elected and eliminate the office of Superintendent entirely, claiming that bureaucracy is the biggest impediment to effective education.  Fayyazi believes that the state superintendent should be an educator with knowledge of how public education works on the ground.

General Election

The Superintendent race was one of the more high-profile and competitive races.  The incumbent, Inez Tenenbaum, opted not to run for re-election after her defeat in the 2004 Senate election against Jim Demint.  Republican Karen Floyd declared her candidacy early and posted strong fundraising numbers, avoiding a run-off in her primary against three opponents.  The Democrat, college president Jim Rex, also showed himself to be an apt fundraiser, and gained the financial support of large segments of the education community.  Rex eventually won the general election in a close election that was decided after a month-long recount.

Adjutant General

The Adjutant General campaign, the only one of its kind in the nation, was interesting not only for its novelty but also because of the entrance of an Iraq War veteran as a Democratic challenger to the incumbent, Stan Spears, a former businessman.  The Democrat, Glenn Lindmann, was critical of the decreasing size of the state's national guard contingent over Spears' time in office, and also wanted to make the position an appointed one instead of an elected one.  Spears countered that the size decrease is due to a national policy decision, not a state one, and said the position should remain elected.  Spears won re-election.

Commissioner of Agriculture

Republican Primary
Hugh Weathers (Incumbent)
William Bell - farmer, 1994 candidate

One of the major issues in the Republican primary was whether the commissioner should be elected or appointed.  Bell was an advocate for election, while Weathers supported appointment.

General Election

The Commissioner elected in 2002, Charles Sharp, was convicted in 2004 for accepting bribes from a cockfighting ring to help them avoid prosecution.  He lost his office and was replaced by Weathers, the interim commissioner.  Weathers was challenged by Democrat Emile DeFelice, an organic hog farmer and State Food Policy Council Chairman.  DeFelice did not face a primary.  DeFelice promoted raising consumption of locally grown foods over food from other states or countries and adopted an anti-subsidy platform that would limit direct subsidies to South Carolina farmers.  Weathers won the general election.

Constitutional Amendments
Amendment 1

Amendment 1 added Section 15 Article XVII of the state constitution, denying recognition of any domestic union other than a marriage between one man and one woman in South Carolina and all its political subdivisions.  This also abolished common-law marriages and civil unions in the state.  The amendment easily passed, although state statute already defined marriage as only between a man and a woman.

Amendments 2A and 2B

These amendments modified Article III.  2A amended Section 9 to allow the State Senate to, at any point, recess for up to 30 days with a simple majority vote, or recess for more than 30 days with a 2/3 majority vote.  This basically extended to the Senate the same powers of recess already possessed by the House.  2B deleted a legal prohibition from Section 21 that prevented either legislative body from adjourning for more than 3 days without the consent of the other.  Both easily passed.

Amendments 3A and 3B

3A modified Article X, Section 16 to allow state retirement funds to be invested in equity securities.  3B modified the same section, deleting language providing for a State Retirement Systems Investment Panel, an advisory body that oversees the investment of state retirement funds.  Both easily passed

Amendment 4

This amended Articles III and X of the constitution, allowing the General Assembly to cap changes in reassessment of property values for tax purposes at 15% over a five-year period.  This amendment was part of a tax reform plan introduced by state Republicans during the summer of 2006, that centered around cutting property taxes and replacing them with an increased sales tax.  Essentially, this amendment limited increases or decreases in millage to 15% of the property's pre-assessment value.

Amendment 5

Amendment 5 amended Article I, Sections 13 and 17, and Article XIV, Section 5, to limit the circumstances in which local governments can use eminent domain to seize private property.  This amendment was part of a national political movement to limit the powers of eminent domain following the famous 2005 Kelo v. City of New London Supreme Court case, in which the Supreme Court backed the power of governments to seize land for the use of private development projects.  The amendment prevented governments in South Carolina from doing so, as well as eliminating constitutional clauses that give certain counties slum-clearing and redevelopment power.

See also
 2006 South Carolina gubernatorial election

References

 
South Carolina